One Hour Mama is the first album by Lavay Smith & Her Red Hot Skillet Lickers. The album was recorded at Bay Records, Berkeley, California.

Track listing

Personnel 
Lavay Smith & Her Red Hot Skillet Lickers
Lavay Smith – vocals
Chris Seibert – piano, arranger
Charlie Seibert – guitar
Larry Leight – trombone
Bing Nathan – string bass
Dan Foltz – drums
Bill Stewart – alto saxophone (tracks 3 - 11), tenor saxophone (tracks 1 - 3)
Harvey Robb – alto saxophone (tracks 1, 2), tenor saxophone (tracks 4 - 10), clarinet (track 11)
Noel Jewkes – tenor saxophone (tracks 2, 4, 10), baritone saxophone (tracks 1, 3, 7), clarinet (tracks 2, 5, 9)

Production
Chris Seibert – production, mixing
Mike Cogan – engineer, mixing
Bing Nathan – mixing
Katherine Miller – cover photography
Greg Reeves – design and artwork

References

External links 

1996 debut albums